Pladform is a Russian digital distribution system for licensed video content. It has been a part of the unified company “Ruform” since 2016, which also includes video hosting Rutube.

Company 
The development of the system began in 2012 within the framework of the company “Pladform”. It was founded by Armen Gulinyan — in the past he was a co-founder of “Pirogov's Bureau” and an employee of the media holding “Yellow, Black and White”, which became the first investor of the new company. In July–August 2013, the company established a partnership with the reseller of “Gazprom-Media Digital” and launched a closed beta testing of the platform. Attempts to attract additional investment from companies of advertising market weren't unsuccessful, so the company was growing from main activities revenues.

In late 2013 the company was invested by the Russian localizer and publisher of online games Innova, and its founder Georgy Chumburidze invited another investor, Ivan Tavrin, to the “Pladform”. According to Gulinyan, at the beginning of 2015 the total investment in the project amounted to about 20 million rubles, and none of the company's co-owners held a controlling ownership interest, so the company's management remained in the hands of the CEO.

In 2015 “Yellow, Black and White” withdrew their capital from “Pladform”. In 2016 it became known about the merger of “Pladform” and the managing company of Russian video hosting Rutube, owned by “Gazprom-Media Holding”. In the merged company “Ruform” the holding got 33.3%, and 66.6% were divided between the owners of “Pladform”. Gulinyan was appointed the general director of the merged company. As a result of the merger, “Gazprom-Media Holding” got access to the content distribution network, and “Pladform” — to the licensed content of the channels included in the structure of “Gazprom-Media”. B2B solutions for rights holders and promotional tools continued to operate under the “Pladform” brand, and B2C platform kept the name Rutube. After the merger, Rutube increased its share of views in Runet from 15% to 40% and made it to the top of the app rankings in Google Play and AppStore.

Model of work 
Pladform acts as an intermediary between rights holders, advertisers and websites, providing storage of video on their own servers and broadcasting via their own media player with video advertising support. Right holders can upload their own content onto websites, which are connected to “Pladform”, and search for any content which was previously uploaded violating the copyright. From legal point of view such videos are being “cleared”. “Pladform” profits from promotional materials included in the video: 75% of the revenue from the advertising goes to the content owner, 25% is shared between the platform and the website that embeds the media player.

In 2015 “Pladform” had 5.95 billion views. By the beginning of 2016, “Pladform” worked with 130 Russian and foreign copyright holders, including “Yellow, Black and White”, “Alexander Maslyakov and Company” (AMiK), “Red Media”, “Gazgolder”, “Krasny Kvadrat” and CTV. The company's player was installed on almost 2.5 thousand websites, including video hosting sites, news and entertainment sites and social networks, including VKontakte, Odnoklassniki and My World@Mail.Ru (they provided about 40% of the views). It is also built into mobile applications and works in Smart TV systems. In the “Pladform” library there are about 1 million units of licensed content. In the summer of 2017 VKontakte opened a content exchange market focused on administrators of public pages of the social network and working on the basis of the combined catalog of “Pladform” and Rutube.

According to Digital Video IAB Russia, as of September 2017, “Pladform” was the second-largest player in the Russian online video market, second only to YouTube (21.5 million and 26.8 million people, respectively).

Awards 
 2014 — “Technology and Innovation” Runet Award.

References

Links 
 

Video hosting